Hymatic, also known as Hymatic Engineering, are a British manufacturer of heat exchangers, fluid control technology and cryogenic systems as part of an aircraft's environmental control system (ECS), headquartered in Worcestershire.

History
The company was founded on 27 September 1937. 

It began making air compressors (pneumatics), anti-g valves, pressure reducing valves, stop valves and fuel system relief valves. Most well-known British aircraft in the 1950s and 1960s contained their valves and pneumatic equipment.

It developed the fuel system for Concorde. Concorde carried around 22,000 gallons of fuel. Concorde's fuel system had to overcome boiling of fuel at high altitudes.

In 2002, the company had a turnover of £21.7m.

Research
It has worked with the Cryogenic Engineering Group at the University of Oxford, in making linear compressors.

Ownership
The company was bought from 3i in February 2004, with the case referred to the Office of Fair Trading (OFT).

Structure
It is situated on the Moon's Moat Industrial Estate in Redditch. The company is registered with the British Cryogenics Council.

Products
 Anti-ice valves
 Cryocoolers for infrared sensors
 Stored energy systems

References

External links
 Grace's Guide
 Crogenic Cooling Solutions 

Aircraft component manufacturers of the United Kingdom
British companies established in 1937
Companies based in Redditch
Cryogenics
Honeywell
Manufacturing companies established in 1937
Science and technology in Worcestershire
Valve manufacturers